The Banquet of Cleopatra is a 1653 painting by Jacob Jordaens. With Group Portrait (1650), The Apostles Paul and Barnabas at Lystra (c.1618) and Portrait of the Artist with his Family (c.1615), it is one of four works by the artist in the Hermitage Museum in St Petersburg. It shows Cleopatra receiving Mark Antony aboard her barge.

Paintings by Jacob Jordaens
1653 paintings
Paintings in the collection of the Hermitage Museum
Paintings depicting Cleopatra
Birds in art
Dogs in art
Food and drink paintings